Juliana de Menis Campos (born 17 October 1996) is a Brazilian athlete specialising in the pole vault. She has won multiple medals at regional level.

Her personal bests in the event are 4.56 metres outdoors (Castellón 2018) and 4.21 metres indoors (São Caetano do Sul 2018).

International competitions

References

1996 births
Living people
Brazilian female pole vaulters
Place of birth missing (living people)
Pan American Games athletes for Brazil
Athletes (track and field) at the 2019 Pan American Games
Competitors at the 2019 Summer Universiade
Ibero-American Championships in Athletics winners
Troféu Brasil de Atletismo winners
21st-century Brazilian women